Lee Ju-hwan(April 10, 1909 - December 2, 1972) was an Ingan-munhwage of Korean traditional song, Gangtok, which is the 41st Important Intangible Cultural Properties of Korea. He is also a master of gasa, which is Korean traditional literature that is an intermediate form of poetry and prose and Lee Ju-hwan is designated as Ingan-munhwage of 30th Important Intangible Cultural Properties of Korea gasa either. He used Sonam as a pseudonym.

Biography
Lee Ju-hwan was born in 1909 May 24 lunar in Jongno-gu, Gwansudong 30, Seoul as the second son of Lee Gik-sang and Choi Game-yeo. His original name was Bok-Gil. In March 1928, he graduated Gyodong public elementary school and entered Part of the aakbuwon Training Center of the yiwangjik aakbu as the 3rd group in April. At that time yiwangjik aakbu gathered students every 5 years and the 3rd group has only 18 members. Sung Kyung-lin, Lee Seok-Jae, Bong Hae-song, Kim Bo-nam, Kim Young-un are all his alumni in yiwangjik aakbu 3rd members. when he was 3rd grade at yiwangjik aakbu, he made Jeonakhoe, which was a group for restoration of aak, traditional music during the Royal ceremony, with his friends. One month before graduating the yiwangjik aakbu, he married Shin Chang-hee in February 1931. In March 1931, he graduated with honors and was designated as an asks who is an aak player. On August 26, 1935, his wife Shin Chang-hee died. He started transcript Yeochang ago after his wife's death and became the head of aak in November 1937. After the independence of Korea, he started to teach Korean dance as an instructor at the yiwangjik aakbu practice room and he also tried to spread ago and Sijo, Korean traditional poetry.

Career
In 1928, organizing Jeonakhoe for the restoration of aak
In April 1931, becoming the head of Baku
in 1933, making advice to transfer the format of Jeongganbo
In 1935, completed the transcription of Nanchang ago
In August 1945, becoming the Director of Liberal Arts in former royal aakbu 
From April 1, 1962, to September 1, 1972, Korean music instructor in Gukaksa school(currently is the Jukka highschool)
In February 1971, establishing ago and gasa school

Awards
In May 1958, winning the 7th Seoul culture award
In July 1971, winning the Academy of Arts award
1958.5.   제7회 서울시 문화상 수상

References
Korean Cultural Heritage Association
Korea Culture Information Service

1909 births
1972 deaths
Korean culture
Singers from Seoul
20th-century South Korean poets
South Korean male poets
Korean singers
20th-century male writers